Hotel Icon may refer to:

Hotel Icon (Houston)
Hotel Icon (Hong Kong)